Deh Now-e Farrokhzad (also romanized as Deh Now-e Farrokhzād; also known as ‘Arab Oghlū) is a village in Khatunabad Rural District, in the Central District of Shahr-e Babak County, Kerman Province, Iran. At the 2006 census, its population was 53, in 11 families.

References 

Populated places in Shahr-e Babak County